Kate Lauren French is an American actress and model. She is perhaps best known for her role as Niki Stevens on The L Word.

Early life
Kate Lauren French was born in Flemington, New Jersey.

Career
Following in her parents' footsteps, French pursued a career in modeling up until her senior year of high school but always had a passion for acting. She first appeared on the big screen in 2006 with a small cameo role in the film Accepted. French's first appearance on the small screen was in 2006, when French starred alongside Tatum O'Neal in the prime-time telenova soap opera Wicked Wicked Games. In 2007 she landed her breakout role when she joined the cast of The L Word playing closeted lesbian actress, and girlfriend of Jenny Schecter, Niki Stevens, appearing in seasons 5 and 6. French also had a role in the teen drama series South of Nowhere as Sasha Miller, a love interest of Aiden Dennison. French then appeared in two episodes of the teen drama Gossip Girl as Elle, a mysterious nanny. In 2010 French had a recurring role as Renee on One Tree Hill and later had a recurring guest role as Riley Westlake in the Hawaii-set teen drama Beyond The Break. In 2009 French played a supporting role in the independent horror film Sutures and then had a leading role in the independent romantic comedy Language of a Broken Heart, which was selected for the Hollywood Film Festival in 2011. French featured in the rock musical film Girltrash: All Night Long, which was released in 2014. 

In 2011, French starred alongside Jason Ritter in the short film, Atlantis, a romance film centered around two strangers who fall in love in the lead up to the final launch of the NASA Space Shuttle Atlantis. and had a leading role in the independent thriller The Red House. French also had a guest role on the television series Up All Night. In 2012, it was announced that French had a supporting role in the independent thriller Channeling. French had a minor role in the indie feminist film Farah Goes Bang directed by Meera Menon. French is attached to the psychological thriller Liquorice. She starred 2014 in the Drama horror film Echoes and was awarded at FilmQuest Cthulhu as Best Actress for this role.

Other work
In 2010, French appeared in television advertisements for Bud Light and 7 Up. In 2011, she appeared in advertisements for sunglasses brand Raen Optics. In 2012, French featured in a television commercial for car company GMC and in 2018 she appeared in the 'Fansville' campaign for Dr Pepper.

Personal life
French is good friends with writers Angela Robinson and Alex Kondracke. In her spare time, French enjoys surfing, water skiing and hiking with her pet dogs. French supports the Surfrider Foundation. In 2008, she appeared alongside comedian Kathy Griffin in a pro-same-sex marriage ad urging California voters to vote against Proposition 8. On September 25, 2010, French married photographer Jon Johnson at her parents' estate in Quogue. She is sometimes featured in his work. They live in Eagle Rock, Los Angeles and have two children: a son, Henry William Johnson; and a daughter, Chapel DeFreine Johnson.  French launched a vintage-inspired jewelry line, The Inheritance LA, in 2015.

Filmography

References

External links

21st-century American actresses
Living people
Actresses from New Jersey
Actresses from New York (state)
Female models from New Jersey
American film actresses
American television actresses
People from Flemington, New Jersey
People from Lambertville, New Jersey
People from Quogue, New York
People from South Kingstown, Rhode Island
Year of birth missing (living people)